The following is a list of Algerian journalists who have been assassinated by salafist terrorism in Algeria.

Journalists

A
 Mustapha Abada
 Ali Abboud
 Mohamed Abderrahmani
 Boussaâd Abdiche
 Khaled Aboulkacem
 Louiza Aït Adda
 Laïd-Ali Aït El Hara
 Allaoua Aït Mebarek
 Zineddine Aliou-Salah
 Yahia Ammour
 Djilali Arabdiou

B

 Saâdeddine Bakhtaoui
 Mouloud Baroudi
 Achour Belghezli
 Mohamed Belkacem
 Messaoud Bellache
 Mohamed-Salah Benachour
 Bakhti Benaouda
 Hassan Benaouda
 Rachid Bendahou
 Abdelkrim Bendaoud
 Hamidou Benkherfallah
 Abdelhamid Benmeni
 Lahcène Bensaadallah
 Yahia Benzaghou
 Zoubida Berkane
 Aziz Bouabdallah
 Djamel Bouchibi
 Khaled Bougherbal
 Ahmed Bouguerra
 Abdallah Bouhachek
 Djamel Bouhidel
 Ali Boukherbache
 Makhlouf Boukhezar
 Kaddour Bousselham
 Tayeb Bouterfif
 Farida Bouziane
 Radja Brahimi
 Saïd Brahimi
 Yasmine Brikh

C
 Abderrahmane Chergou
 Ferhat Cherkit

D

 Khadidja Dahmani
 Djamel Deraza
 Tahar Djaout
 Saïda Djebaïli
 Mohamed Dorbane
 Dalila Drideche
 Yasmina Drissi

E
 Yasser El Akel

F
 Djamel Eddine Fahassi
 Mohamed Fettah

G
 Omar Guebriout
 Hichem Guenifi
 Khaled Guerdjouma

H

 Houria Hammadi
 Rachida Hammadi
 Naïma Hamouda
 Mokrane Hamoui
 Abdelwahab Harrouche
 Mohamed Hassaïne
 Mourad Hemazi
 Abdelkader Hireche

I
 Naïma Illoul
 Ahmed Issaad

K
 Mohamed Kessab
 Ahmed Khalfoun
 Rachid Khodja
 Salah Kitouni

L
 Nassereddine Lakhal
 Rabah Lallali
 Ahmed-Mustapha Lazhar
 Mohamed-Lamine Legoui

M

 Hamid Mahiout
 Saïd Mekbel
 Mohamed Meceffeuk
 Mohamed Mekati
 Khaled Merioud

O
 Ameur Ouagueni
 Mahmoud Ouarhoum
 Nacer Ouari
 Omar Ourtilane

R
 Si-Ali Reguieg

S
 Abdelwahab Saadaoui
 Belkacem Saadi
 Malika Sabour
 Azzeddine Saïdj
 Smaïl Sbaghdi
 Noureddine Serdouk
 El-Hadi Slim

T
 Mourad Taam
 Ahmed Takouchet
 
 Ali Tenkhi
 Slim Tria

Y

 Abdelmadjid Yacef
 Abdelmadjid Yahiaoui

Z
 Rabah Zenati
 Farah Ziane
 Djameleddine Zaïter

See also
 List of Algerian people
 List of Algerian writers

References

 
Death-related lists